The Urban Music Awards (UMA) is a hip-hop, R&B, dance, and soul music awards ceremony which was launched by Jordan Kensington in 2003 and is now held in several countries.

The US version of the award ceremony, the Urban Music Awards USA, was launched on 7 July 2007 at Hammerstein Ballroom, hosted by Foxy Brown and Spragga Benz, with award winners including Adele, Danity Kane, Jay Z, Grandmaster Flash, Sean Paul, Beyoncé, Bobby V, Enrique Iglesias, Rihanna, Lupe Fiasco, Mary Mary, Amy Winehouse, Leona Lewis, and Chip.

History
The Urban Music Awards were launched by Jordan Kensington in 2003 to recognise the achievement of urban-based artists, producers, club nights, DJs, radio stations, record labels, and artists from the current R&B, hip hop, neo soul, jazz, and dance music scene.

The winners are selected by an online public vote.

Urban Music Awards USA 2009

The 2009 Urban Music Awards were held on 17 July 2009 at the Hammerstein Ballroom in New York City before returning to London on 1 November for the UK version of the show. The 2009 return was covered by major international press, including OK! Magazine, the Daily Express, and the Insider. 2009 also saw the launch of the Best Asian Act category to celebrate artists and musicians of Asian origin, which was widely covered within the Asian media worldwide.

2003: 1st Year 
The awards took place in Hammersmith Palais.

2004
The awards took place at the Barbican.

2005
The venue was Wembley Arena.

2006
The awards took place in the Grand Connaught Rooms.

2007
The awards took place in the Grand Connaught Rooms.

2008
The awards took place at 02 Arena.

2009
The awards took place at Wembley Arena.

2010
The awards took place at Grand Connaught.

2011
The awards took place at Porchester.

2012
The awards took place at Grand Connaught.

2013
The awards took place at Grand Connaught.

2014
Winners for the Urban Music Awards 2014 included:

2015
In 2015 the UMA events returned in London. Over 770,000 votes were received online.  The show was hosted by founder, Jordan Kensington and singer/songwriter, Kiera Weathers. The awards included performances from Big Narstie, Kid Army, Kym Mazell, Rough Copy, Kelvin Jones, Chos3n and Young Kings. The UMA official house band, the Dominos provided the backdrop to music performed on stage by Macklemoore and a collaboration of "Ready or Not" by Fugees featuring the hosts. Lady Leshurr won record three awards for UMA Best Music Video 2015, Best Female Act 2015, and Best HipHop Act 2015.

2016

2017

2018

2020

2022

References

External links
 Urban Music Awards

American music awards
Black British music